Connolly Basin is a 9 km-diameter impact crater located in the Gibson Desert of central Western Australia. It lies adjacent to the Talawana Track 45 km west of the junction (Windy Corner) with the Gary Highway, but is difficult to access due to the remoteness of the area. It was originally thought to be a diapir (salt dome); an impact origin was first proposed in 1985.,

Description 

The depression has a topographic rim 25–30 m high, while the centre displays a slight circular rise about 1 km in diameter and 5 m high exposing strongly deformed and steeply dipping bedrock interpreted as a central uplift., Sedimentary rocks comprising the rim are of Early Cretaceous to Palaeogene age, while uplifted rocks in the centre are likely of Early Permian age, all part of the Canning Basin; the impact event itself is inferred to be of Paleocene (early Paleogene) age or later.,

References 

Impact craters of Western Australia
Paleocene impact craters
Paleocene Australia